Addison is an incorporated town in Dallas County, Texas, in the United States. Addison is situated to the immediate north of the city of Dallas, with a 2020 census population of 16,661. Addison and Flower Mound were the only two Texas municipalities labeled "towns" with a population greater than 10,000 at the 2010 census; since then the municipalities of Prosper and Trophy Club—also identifying as towns—have also exceeded 10,000 in population estimates.

History

The land occupied by present-day Addison was settled as early as 1846 when Preston Witt built a house near White Rock Creek.

In 1902 the community named itself Addison, after Addison Robertson, who served as postmaster from 1908 to 1916. The first industry was a cotton gin, opening in 1902 on Addison Road.

The community was formerly known as Noell Junction after settler Sidney Smith Noell, after whom Noel Road and Knoll Trail are named.

As a city, Addison was incorporated on June 15, 1953. The first mayor of Addison was M. W. Morris, and the aldermen were Guy Dennis, Robert W. Wood, J. E. Julian, Jr., Dr. H. T. Nesbit, and Seldon Knowles. In 1982 the name was changed to "Town of Addison."

Geography
Addison is bordered by the cities of Dallas, Farmers Branch, and Carrollton.

Demographics

As of the 2020 United States census, there were 16,661 people, 8,342 households, and 3,217 families residing in the town.

Economy

Though Addison had only slightly over 13,000 residents, daytime population is estimated at over 100,000 as of 2010.

With more than 170 restaurants, there is a restaurant for every 79 Addison residents. Addison is a popular location for many Dallas-area restaurants because Addison allows restaurants to serve alcoholic beverages by the drink, while many nearby municipalities do not. Addison has 22 hotels, featuring a total of at least 4,000 hotel rooms and meeting facilities.

Addison Airport consumes roughly half of the town's  and is the third-largest general aviation airport in the nation. Major corporate headquarters in Addison include Dresser, Daseke and Mary Kay Cosmetics. Other major employers in Addison include Bank of America, Concentra and IWG.

Addison is also home to Hand Drawn Pressing, the world's first fully-automated vinyl record pressing plant.

Parks and recreation
Addison has  of parkland. Addison's first town park opened in 1978. The Dallas Independent School District operates the Alfred J. Loos Athletic Complex in Addison.

The Addison Athletic Club is a 52,000 sq. ft. residents-only facility that features indoor and outdoor swimming pools, a gymnasium, fitness equipment, and racquetball courts.

Culture and arts

There are special events in Addison 22 weekends of the year. The WaterTower Theatre produces plays and musicals and hosts the annual Out of the Loop Festival. The Cavanaugh Flight Museum houses a collection of aircraft since World War I. Addison Circle Park, built in the early 2000s, is a venue for several seasonal outdoor events, such as the "Addison Kaboom Town!," "Addison Oktoberfest," and the foodie fun event, "Fork & Cork". The Addison Improv Comedy Club hosts regular weekly shows with well-known headliners.

Addison is noted for being home to the original locations of both Texas de Brazil and Fogo de Chão, two Brazilian Churrascaria franchises that are both in the midst of rapid national expansion.

Education
The Addison School building was opened in 1914. In 1954 the school became a part of the Dallas ISD, and the school closed in 1964. The school building is now the "Magic Time Machine Restaurant."

McLaughlin was built in 1959. Field was built in 1960. Stark opened in 1963. R. L. Turner High School opened in 1962, replacing Carrollton High School.

Prior to fall 2006, all Addison residents were zoned to Frank for Kindergarten through 4th Grade, E. D. Walker Elementary School for 5th and 6th grades, and Marsh Middle School for 7th and 8th grades. Junkins Elementary School opened in fall 2006, relieving Anne Frank, and Tom C. Gooch Elementary School took an additional portion of Frank's attendance zone. During the same year, Walker became a middle school, serving the Frank and Junkins-zoned sections of Addison, while the Gooch-zoned section was still assigned to Marsh.

In fall 2008 boundary changes rezoned the Frank-zoned section of Addison from W. T. White and Walker to Hillcrest and Franklin. In addition, Strickland was dedicated in 2008.

George Herbert Walker Bush Elementary School opened in Addison in 2011. As a result, boundary changes during that year involve Bush taking attendance zone territory from Tom C. Gooch, Frank, and Junkins elementary schools. Because of Bush's opening, now Walker MS and White MS served the Junkins and Bush zones, while Franklin continued to serve the Frank zone. Because Gooch is no longer serving portions of Addison, Marsh Middle School no longer serves portions of Addison.

Public schools

Most residents are zoned to the Dallas Independent School District, while those on the southern end of Spring Valley and Vitruvian Way are zoned to the Carrollton-Farmers Branch Independent School District.

All residents within the DISD portion of Addison may attend George H. W. Bush Elementary School in Addison. Bush's attendance boundary covers most of Addison. DISD Addison residents living outside of the Bush attendance boundary are not provided transportation to attend Bush. Other DISD elementary schools serving sections of Addison include Anne Frank Elementary School in Dallas and Jerry Junkins Elementary School in Carrollton.

The Town of Addison asked Dallas ISD to build Bush with environmentally sensitive materials. The PreK–5 school was built as part of a bond approved in May 2008. Bush is adjacent to the Greenhill School and is located along Addison's trail system; therefore the school will be accessible by bicycle or on foot from the Les Lacs and Midway Meadows subdivisions. Bush has two athletic fields located north of the playgrounds. During non-school hours Addison residents may use the fields.

Residents zoned to Bush and Junkins are zoned to Walker Middle School and W.T. White High School in Dallas. Residents zoned to Frank are zoned to Benjamin Franklin Middle School and Hillcrest High School.

A portion of the C-FBISD area is served by Stark Elementary School in Farmers Branch. Another portion is served by Neil Ray McLaughlin Elementary School (K–2) in Carrollton and Nancy H. Strickland Intermediate School (3–5) in Farmers Branch. All of the C-FBISD portion is served by Vivian Field Middle School in Farmers Branch, and R. L. Turner High School in Carrollton.

Private schools

Addison is the home of two private schools, both co-educational: Greenhill School, which enrolls over 1,200 students from preschool to high school, and Trinity Christian Academy, which enrolls over 1,400 from preschool to high school.

Community colleges

The Texas Legislature defines areas in Dallas County and areas in CFBISD as being in the service area of Dallas College (formerly Dallas County Community College District).

Politics

See also
 Blueprints at Addison Circle
 Vitruvian Park

Notes

References

External links

 Town of Addison official website
 Addison community website
 Rotary Club of Addison
 Addison Town Guide
 George Herbert Walker Bush Elementary School
 Article "Addison" in the Handbook of Texas

 
Towns in Dallas County, Texas
Towns in Texas
Populated places established in 1953
1953 establishments in Texas